VIP Magazin is a magazine from Chișinău, Moldova, that was established in 2004. The magazine has a show with the same name on Pro TV Chișinău, since 2007.

References

External links 
 Archive VIP Magazin
 Rodica Cioranica: I am a personality which doesn’t like printings…

2004 establishments in Moldova
Magazines established in 2004
Magazines published in Moldova
Mass media in Chișinău